A list of the films produced in Mexico in 1949 (see 1949 in film):

1949

External links

1949
Films
Lists of 1949 films by country or language